The civil parish of Haydon Wick is a northern suburb of the town of Swindon, Wiltshire, in England. It had a population of 20,960 in the 2011 census.

The parish includes the former hamlet of Haydon and the suburbs of Greenmeadow and Rodbourne Cheney.

Government
The first tier of local government is Haydon Wick Parish Council, with two electoral wards: Haydon End (9 councillors) and Haydon Wick (9 councillors). The council is concerned with the overall economic, cultural and physical well-being of the residents of Greenmeadow, Haydon Wick village, Haydonleigh, Abbey Meads, Haydon End, Taw Hill, Oakhurst, Woodhall Park and West Moredon.

The parish lies within the Borough of Swindon where it is represented by six Borough Councillors for the wards of Haydon Wick and Priory Vale.

History
Prior to 1928 Haydon Wick was part of the parish of Rodbourne Cheney.

Gas was installed in 1930, electricity arrived in 1939 and sewers came after 1928.

Originally a small village, during the latter part of the twentieth century and continuing today, housebuilding has extended the number of properties within the parish considerably. Parts of the parish fall within the Priory Vale northern development. The North Swindon District Centre (or Orbital Shopping Park), which includes a large Asda supermarket, is within the parish.

Transport

The Swindon and Cricklade Railway has rebuilt Blunsdon railway station and Hayes Knoll railway station, although these are located just outside the parish boundary, and within the parish Taw Valley Halt has been opened since 2014. The railway society is currently building a new station at Moulden Hill which lies within the parish and country park.

Swindon's Bus Company provides the regular local bus service from Haydon Wick into Swindon town.

Amenities
The River Ray flows through the parish; it offers pleasant walks and is home to many species of fish and wildlife.

Known locally as Clifford Meadow, Haydon Meadow is a Site of Special Scientific Interest within the Parish where Anacamptis morio, a rare protected species of Orchid family Orchidaceae may be seen. This flower was adopted as the logo for the Priory Vale development, elements of which lie within the parish.

Mouldon Hill Country Park lies within the parish; the park has a number of paths and walkway together with a delightful hidden lake, and within it a new steam railway station is being created by the Swindon and Cricklade Railway.

Churches
Churches within the parish include Christ The Servant, St John the Evangelist and Emmanual URC.

Schools
Primary schools within the parish are Catherine Wayte, Greenmeadow, Haydonleigh, Haydon Wick, Orchid Vale Primary, and St. Francis. There is one secondary school, Nova Hreod Academy.

References

External links

Haydon Wick Parish Council
Haydon Wick Parish Council – Parish Boundary Map
The Swindon & Cricklade Railway
Thamesdown Transport 

Borough of Swindon
Civil parishes in Wiltshire